Todd Orlando (born March 24, 1971) is an American football coach. He is the defensive coordinator at the University of South Florida. He served as the defensive coordinator at the University of Texas at Austin from 2017 to 2019 and the University of Southern California (USC) from 2020 to 2021. Prior to Texas, he was the defensive coordinator and linebackers coach at the University of Houston. Prior to coaching at Houston, he was the defensive coordinator at Utah State University.

Playing career
Orlando played linebacker at Central Catholic High School in Pittsburgh and then was a three-year (1991–1993) letterwinner at inside linebacker at the University of Wisconsin and a member of the 1993 Wisconsin Badgers football team, which shared the Big Ten Conference title and that defeated UCLA in 1994 Rose Bowl, in the Badgers' first Rose Bowl appearance since 1963.

References

External links
 Florida Atlantic profile
 USC profile

1972 births
Living people
American football linebackers
Florida Atlantic Owls football coaches
FIU Panthers football coaches
Houston Cougars football coaches
Penn Quakers football coaches
South Florida Bulls football coaches
Texas Longhorns football coaches
UConn Huskies football coaches
USC Trojans football coaches
Wisconsin Badgers football players
Utah State Aggies football coaches
High school football coaches in Pennsylvania
Coaches of American football from Pennsylvania
Players of American football from Pittsburgh